Zhang Junlong (born 12 November 1981) is a Chinese professional boxer who held the WBA Oceania heavyweight title between 2016 and 2017.

Professional career

Zhang made his professional debut in 2012 at the age of 31, winning all of his 20 fights by knockout.

On January 23, 2014, he faced David Koswara to win his first professional titles, the inaugural WBA Asian and CPBF Asian heavyweight titles. One month later he defeated unknown fighter Timor Benz to win the vacant WBF Asia Pacific heavyweight title. During May of the same year he won via a fifth-round knockout against former cruiserweight Nico Toriri for the vacant IBO Asia Pacific heavyweight title.

On November 30, 2014, Zhang faced veteran journeyman Jason Gavern, stopping him in the third round to win the vacant WBF Intercontinental and WBU heavyweight interim (German version) titles, making him one of the few Chinese fighters to win a minor world title.

On 11 April 2016, Zhang extended his perfect record and took out Brazilian George Arias (56-16, 42) in 2 rounds in Jinghong to claim the WBA Oceania Heavyweight title.

In 2017, Zhang refused to pay the WBA's sanctioning fees, thus he was removed from their rankings.

It was reported on January 26, 2022, that Zhang's wife, Nana, died.

Professional boxing record

References

External links
 

|-

|-

1981 births
Living people
Chinese male boxers
Heavyweight boxers
Asian Games medalists in boxing
Asian Games bronze medalists for China
Boxers at the 2002 Asian Games
Medalists at the 2002 Asian Games
Sportspeople from Qingdao
21st-century Chinese people